Wilson, also known as Wilson Village, is an unincorporated community located in Lewis County, Washington. The former town is in a rural area in the mid-south region of the county, south of Winston and 7-miles south of Mayfield. Communities and towns around Riffe Lake are 12-miles to the northeast of the area. Wilson is mostly residential in nature.

The community once had a post office that began in 1891 and closed in 1924. There was a school in the town during this time. The local economy was based on farming and logging, with a focus on shingle production in part due to its location to Salmon Creek, which was used to float the shingles to the Cowlitz River near Toledo. The town was once connected to Toledo by the use of a plank road.

References

Populated places in Lewis County, Washington
Unincorporated communities in Lewis County, Washington
Unincorporated communities in Washington (state)